Eresus rotundiceps is a spider species found in Ukraine and Turkmenistan.

See also 
 List of Eresidae species

References 

Eresidae
Spiders of Europe
Fauna of Ukraine
Spiders of Central Asia
Spiders described in 1873
Taxa named by Eugène Simon